Koutalas (Greek: Κουταλάς) may refer to several places in Greece:

Koutalas, Corinthia, a village in the municipal unit Tenea, Corinthia 
Koutalas, Messenia, a village in the municipality Kalamata, Messenia 
Koutalas, Cyclades, a village in the island of Serifos, one of the Cyclades
Koutalas Cave, a cave on Serifos